ERDF may refer to:

 European Regional Development Fund, a fund allocated by the European Union
 Électricité Réseau Distribution France, the operators of some of the electricity distribution system in France
 Embedded RDF,  a syntax for writing HTML 
 Environmental Restoration Disposal Facility, at the Hanford Site, US